The ski cap is a type of field cap used by several German-speaking or German-influenced armed forces since the late 19th century. The design originates from imperial Austria-Hungary, but is best known for its widespread use as M43 field cap used by the German Wehrmacht and SS during World War II. The design and its successors still in use today are the German counterparts to the American patrol cap or utility cover.

Variants
There are several variants of the ski cap, starting with the 's ski cap. This was the first in the family of caps, and was recognized by a high peak, a teardrop shaped top, a short bill, and a small skirt that folds down to protect the ears in cold. All  had a small edelweiss or a grouping of  leaves, depending on the unit. During the Second World War, the ski cap was generally made of field grey or field blue wool, depending on whether it was used by the Heer, SS, or the Luftwaffe.

The precursor to the German  was a service cap first issued to Austrian Imperial-Royal Mountain Troops in 1906. Both the German and Austrian  bore edelweiss insignia, the mark of an experienced mountain climber, but, unlike the leather peaks of the Austrian caps, the peak of the German cap was covered with slate grey wool.

The sides of the  stand almost straight up, due to the wide top sewn onto the cap. The skirt that surrounds the cap is made in the same wool as the cap, and is double layered in the rear three quarters of the skirt, enabling it to be folded down over the ears. The skirt has a small dip in the front quarter with a divide secured by two small buttons in order to get the skirt around the bill. The small section in the front quarter was built shorter to show the insignia, and cover the wearer's chin or mouth, without disturbing breathing by covering the nose.

Use of similar headwear in Finland
The ski cap -like design was introduced in the Finnish Army and Finnish Air Force in the field uniform of model 1936, which was based on contemporary German models.

The cap was used by all ranks during the Second World War and long afterwards. As with all caps of the Finnish Defence Forces, rank-and-file and junior NCOs wore the cap with a roundel-type cockade of white-blue-white, while officers and senior NCOs wore a red cockade featuring a golden lion of Finland. The cap was finally phased out in 2014.

Modern use

The caps have the "fake fold" mentioned above, and are issued in medium grey for enlisted personnel and a lighter grey with silver piping around the brim for officers. The Edelweiss is still on the left side of the cap above the ear, and the cockade and crossed-swords insignia are present on the front above the bill. Many modern German police units also use a variant of the M43. Additionally, all other army units wear a simplified version of the M43 cap, without the fold-down ear flaps, in standard  camouflage with a BeVo cockade on the front. This is generally worn in the field instead of the Beret.

Gallery

See also
Imperial Austrian Landwehr
Nazi uniform
Uniforms and insignia of the Luftwaffe
Waffen SS uniform
Kepi

References

Citations

Sources 

 Original field caps section of militaria vendor

Caps
German military uniforms